The 1872 Michigan gubernatorial election was held on November 5, 1872. Republican nominee John J. Bagley defeated Democratic nominee William Montague Ferry Jr. with 61.93% of the vote.

General election

Candidates
Major party candidates
John J. Bagley, Republican
William Montague Ferry Jr., Democratic
Other candidates
Austin Blair, Liberal Republican
Henry Fish, Prohibition

Results

References

1872
Michigan
Gubernatorial
November 1872 events